The Davros Mission is a Doctor Who audio play written and directed by Nicholas Briggs. Initially exclusive to the Complete Davros Collection DVD box set released on 26 November 2007, it was later made available for digital purchase outside of the set by Big Finish in January 2012. It was recorded on 15 August 2007. The music and sound design were composed by David Darlington.

Synopsis
After his capture on Necros, Davros is destined to face the justice of the Daleks. He sits alone, isolated in his cell. His creations will no longer listen to him. But out of the darkness comes a voice... Davros is no longer alone in his torment. Before he faces trial on the planet Skaro, he must go through an ordeal that will force him to the very limits of his sanity. But where do his true loyalties lie? How will he face the future?

Cast
Davros — Terry Molloy
Lareen — Miranda Raison
Alydon and Gus — Sean Connolly
Computer and Raz — Gregg Newton
Daleks — Nicholas Briggs

Cast notes
Sean Connolly who voiced Alydon and Gus also voiced Councillor Quested in the I, Davros audio stories.
Miranda Raison played Tallulah in the new series TV episodes Daleks in Manhattan/Evolution of the Daleks.

See also
Television serials featuring Davros:
Genesis of the Daleks
Destiny of the Daleks
Resurrection of the Daleks
Revelation of the Daleks
Remembrance of the Daleks
The Stolen Earth
Journey's End
The Magician's Apprentice
The Witch's Familiar
Audio stories featuring Davros:
Davros
The Juggernauts
Terror Firma
I, Davros: Innocence
I, Davros: Purity
I, Davros: Corruption
I, Davros: Guilt
Masters of War (Doctor Who Unbound series, out of normal Doctor Who continuity)

External links
The Davros Mission at BigFinish.com

Davros audio plays
Audio plays by Nicholas Briggs